Ages is an unincorporated coal town and census-designated place (CDP) in Harlan County, Kentucky, United States.

History
A post office called "Ages" was established in 1892, and the post office removed to Brookside, Kentucky and its name changed to "Ages-Brookside" in 1975. The community takes its name from nearby Ages Creek.

The community was listed by the U.S. Census Bureau as a census-designated place in 2014. Population estimated at 439 in the 2017 US Census American Community Survey.

Geography
Ages is located in central Harlan County in the valley of the Clover Fork of the Cumberland River. It is bordered to the west by Brookside and to the east by Verda, both unincorporated. The Clover Fork valley lies between Black Mountain to the north and Little Black Mountain to the south.

Kentucky Route 38 is the main road through Ages, leading west down the Clover Fork valley  to Harlan, the county seat, and east  to Evarts.

Demographics

References

Census-designated places in Harlan County, Kentucky
Census-designated places in Kentucky
Coal towns in Kentucky